Neottia auriculata (syn. Listera auriculata), the auricled twayblade, is a species of terrestrial orchid found in northeastern North America (Labrador, New Brunswick and Maine west to Manitoba and Minnesota.

Description
N. auriculata when mature, has two ovate, sessile leaves that are paired on the stem but arranged oppositely. It has small pale-green flowers with three sepals and three petals, the lowest petal is modified into a wider lip - which is divided from one-fourth to one-third its length.

Distribution and habitat
N. auriculata is a rare orchid species, which was in 1975 proposed as a threatened species in the US, but subsequent surveys found that it existed in greater abundance than initially thought. In the Great lakes region it occupies a very specific habitat, which has sandy soils just about the high water line of rivers that enter lake Superior. It is associated with alders or mossy-banks under trees.

References

External links 

auriculata
Plants described in 1899
Orchids of North America
Flora of Eastern Canada
Flora of the Northeastern United States
Flora without expected TNC conservation status